Marina Suma (born 14 November 1959) is an Italian actress.

Life and career 
Born in Naples, Suma started her career as a glamour model, and made her film debut in Salvatore Piscicelli's Le occasioni di Rosa. For her performance in this film she won a David di Donatello for best new actress. Later she starred in Carlo Vanzina's Sapore di mare and in a number of successful comedy films. From the 1990s she focused her activities on television.

Selected filmography 

  The Opportunities of Rosa (1981)
  Time for Loving  (1982)
  Sing Sing (1983)
  A Boy and a Girl (1983)
  Cuori nella tormenta (1984)
  Blues metropolitano (1985)
  Sweets from a Stranger (1987)
  Dark Bar (1989)
  Disperatamente Giulia (1989)
  Infelici e contenti (1992)
  Pater Familias (2003)
  Mozzarella Stories (2011)

References

External links 
 

Living people
Italian film actresses
1959 births
Actresses from Naples
David di Donatello winners
Italian television actresses
Italian stage actresses
Italian female models
People of Sicilian descent
Models from Naples